The Chigirin uezd was one of the subdivisions of the Kiev Governorate of the Russian Empire. It was situated in the southeastern part of the governorate. Its administrative centre was Chigirin (Chyhyryn).

Demographics
At the time of the Russian Empire Census of 1897, Chigirin uezd had a population of 225,915. Of these, 89.4% spoke Ukrainian, 8.6% Yiddish, 1.4% Russian, 0.3% Polish, 0.1% Belarusian and 0.1% Romani as their native language.

References

 
Uezds of Kiev Governorate
1795 establishments in the Russian Empire
1923 disestablishments in Ukraine